The 1993 Georgia Tech Yellow Jackets football team represented the Georgia Institute of Technology in the 1993 NCAA Division I-A football season. The Yellow Jackets were led by head coach Bill Lewis. Georgia Tech played its home games at Bobby Dodd Stadium in Atlanta.

Schedule

References

Georgia Tech
Georgia Tech Yellow Jackets football seasons
Georgia Tech Yellow Jackets football